The bubble chair was designed by Finnish furniture designer Eero Aarnio in 1968. It is based on his Ball Chair. The main difference is that the Bubble Chair is attached to the ceiling with a chain, while being made of transparent material which lets the light inside from all directions. The acrylic is heated and blown into a round shape like a soap bubble, within a solid steel frame. It is considered an industrial design classic and to have advanced the usage of plastics in furniture design. The chair is considered modernist or Space Age in design and is often used to symbolize the 1960s period.

See also
List of chairs
Ball Chair
Philippe Starck, designer of the Bubble Club Armchair and Sofa

References

Products introduced in 1968
Chairs
Finnish inventions
Individual models of furniture
Space Age